Kang Shin-il (born November 26, 1960) is a South Korean actor. Kang graduated from Kyung Hee University with a degree in electronic engineering, but he soon put aside his studies and spent most of his time in Daehangno, Seoul's theater district, where he formed a troupe called Testimony that performed at smaller venues. In 1985, he made his acting debut in Chilsu and Mansu, and soon gained fame as a stage actor in plays such as Kimchigook Goes Crazy and Chronicles of Han. He appeared onscreen for the first time in the 1988 film adaptation of Chilsu and Mansu and became a prolific supporting actor in Korean cinema and television (notably in Kang Woo-suk's Public Enemy franchise), while continuing to do theater. In 2007, Kang was diagnosed with liver cancer, but after recovering from surgery, he resumed his acting career.

Filmography

Film

Television series

Variety show

Music Video

Theater

Awards and nominations

References

External links 
 Kang Shin-il at Star Village Entertainment 
 
 
 
 Kang Shin-il Fan Cafe at Daum 

1960 births
Living people
20th-century South Korean male actors
21st-century South Korean male actors
South Korean male film actors
South Korean male television actors
South Korean male stage actors
Kyung Hee University alumni